Hawaiian Punch is an American brand of fruit punch currently manufactured by Keurig Dr Pepper, originally invented in 1934 by A.W. Leo, Tom Yeats, and Ralph Harrison as a topping for ice cream. It was started from an original syrup flavor called Leo's Hawaiian Punch, containing orange, pineapple, passion fruit, guava and papaya, and is currently offering 14 different flavors since 2020. The drink is currently made with 3% fruit juice. 

In 1961, the Atherton-Privett ad agency created a 20-second commercial to advertise Hawaiian Punch drink.

History
Leo's Hawaiian Punch was created as an ice cream topping syrup in 1934 by A.W. Leo, Tom Yeats, and Ralph Harrison in a converted garage in Fullerton, California. It originally contained 5 fruit juices: orange, pineapple, passion fruit, guava and papaya—all imported from Hawaii. Although customers later discovered that it made an appealing drink when mixed with water, Hawaiian Punch (with "Leo's" name omitted) was only available wholesale in gallon glass jugs to ice cream parlors and soda fountains. The original company was named Pacific Citrus Products (PCP). 

In 1946, Reuben P. Hughes purchased the company and renamed it the Pacific Hawaiian Products Company and quickly set about making Hawaiian Punch Base available directly to consumers in 1 quart glass containers. The immediate post-war period saw the introduction of ready-to-serve Hawaiian Punch in 46 oz tins (1950) & frozen concentrate (1955). Sometime around 1954, the brand was expanded to a second flavor, Sunshine Yellow. The original red Hawaiian Punch became the "Rosy" flavor. At that same time, a sixth fruit flavor, apricot puree, was added to the formula. The Sunshine Yellow flavor omitted the orange juice of the original and replaced the original red food coloring with yellow. By 1955, Hawaiian Punch had become a national brand.

R. J. Reynolds Tobacco Company bought Pacific Hawaiian in 1962 and later transferred it to its newly acquired Del Monte subsidiary in 1981. Procter & Gamble bought Hawaiian Punch from Del Monte Foods, spun off from RJR Nabisco in 1989, a year later.  Procter & Gamble sold Hawaiian Punch to Cadbury Schweppes in 1999. Dr Pepper Snapple was spun off from Cadbury Schweppes in 2008. In 2018, Dr Pepper Snapple merged with Keurig Green Mountain to become Keurig Dr Pepper.

Mascot
In 1961, the Atherton-Privett ad agency created a 20-second commercial to advertise Hawaiian Punch drink. The commercial was produced by John Urie and Associates in Hollywood. Jean Guy Jacques was the director; Bob Guidi and John Urie designed the two characters, Punchy and Oaf. Ross Martin did Punchy's voice, "Hey! How 'bout a nice Hawaiian Punch?" and John Urie did Oaf's line, "Sure". Rod Scribner animated the commercials. Sam Cornell also worked on the later versions. Oaf never learned to say "No" and he was always punched. The commercial ended with Punchy leaning on a can of Hawaiian Punch, saying, "Wasn't that a refreshing commercial?" The commercial won many awards. The Punchy and Oaf (sometimes called "Opie") characters were used in the product's commercials well into the 1980s, and again for a period in the early 1990s.

Flavors

Original Syrup
 Leo's Hawaiian Punch
(became Hawaiian Punch, but the original consumer product in 1946 was called Hawaiian Punch Base)

Original canned flavors
 Rosy Red (later Fruit Juicy)
 Sunshine Yellow

2 additional flavors by 1966
 Orange
 Grape
(Sunshine Yellow contained banana puree by 1966)

Other flavors 1967 & later
 Cherry
 Strawberry
 Lemonade

Added 1969
 Fruit Juicy Red Low Calorie

Added 1971
 Cherry Royal

1975 canned flavors
 Fruit Juicy Red
 Great Grape
 Sunshine Orange
 Tropical Fruit
 Very Berry
 Fruit Punch Low Sugar

1975 "Drink Mix" flavors
Red Punch
Strawberry Punch
Tutti Frutti Punch

Post-1980 canned flavors
 Fruit Juicy Red
 Fruit Juicy Red Light
 Green Berry Rush: strawberry and kiwi
 Mazin' Melon Mix: melon
 Bodacious Berry: berry
 Orange Ocean: orange
 Wild Purple Smash: grape and berry
 Lemonade: old-fashioned lemonade
 Berry Blue Typhoon: strawberry, blueberry, raspberry and kiwi
 Berry Bonkers: strawberry, blueberry, raspberry and pomegranate
 Lemon Berry Squeeze: strawberry and lemonade
 Berry Limeade Blast: strawberry and limeade
 Lemon Lime Splash: lemon and lime
 Island Citrus Guava: guava and lime
 Polar Blast: orange and raspberry
 Mango Passionfruit Squeeze: mango and passion fruit
 Mango Monsoon: orange, mango and pineapple
 White Water Wave: coconut and pineapple
 Watermelon Berry Boom: strawberry and watermelon

Product flavors since 2020 
The following fruit flavors are offered by Keurig Dr Pepper:
 Hawaiian Punch Berry Blue Typhoon Juice Drink
 Hawaiian Punch Berry Bonkers Juice Drink
 Hawaiian Punch Berry Limeade Blast Juice Drink
 Hawaiian Punch Fruit Juicy Red Juice Drink
 Hawaiian Punch Fruit Juicy Red Juice Drink Light
 Hawaiian Punch Green Berry Rush Juice Drink
 Hawaiian Punch Lemon Berry Squeeze Juice Drink
 Hawaiian Punch Lemon Lime Splash Juice Drink
 Hawaiian Punch Lemonade Juice Drink
 Hawaiian Punch Mango Monsoon Juice Drink
 Hawaiian Punch Orange Ocean Juice Drink
 Hawaiian Punch Punch Polar Blast Juice Drink
 Hawaiian Punch Watermelon Berry Boom Juice Drink
 Hawaiian Punch Whitewater Wave Juice Drink

References

External links 

 
History of Hawaiian Punch

Keurig Dr Pepper brands
Juice brands
Products introduced in 1934